Martha Ormaza Bermeo (July 13, 1959 – October 22, 2018) was an Ecuadorian actress, writer, and director, a member of the theatrical group Las Marujitas.

Biography
Martha Ormaza was born in Alausí Canton on July 13, 1959. She considered herself a native of Quito, having lived in the Ecuadorian capital since her first year. At age two she began attending Los Pinos school.

She studied at the Central University of Ecuador's Faculty of Law and obtained a licentiate in public and social sciences. After a vocational crisis, in which she felt she had erred in her choice of career, she never practiced law in Ecuador. While accompanying her mother-in-law to the rehearsal of a play, she was asked to fill in for a cast member who was absent. She impressed the director, as a natural performer, and he convinced her to dedicate herself to the theater. Ormaza went on to act in films, theater, television, and radio.

After its success, she and her costars Juana Guarderas and Elena Torres, who played Abrilia and Cleta respectively, became widely known as Las Marujitas. Ormaza was often identified with her character as Doña Encarna or Maruja Mona. The three reprised their roles for decades, performing more than 1,800 times in the original play, its spin-offs, and radio and television segments.

In her acting career, Ormaza participated in artistic workshops such as El Clown, El actor y el bufón, La Máscara, La Comedia del Arte, El Teatro Gestual, La voz: instrumento para la creación de personajes, El comic: medio de comunicación, La voz: instrumento pre expresivo, Ritmo y percusión, and Tango. She was also part of the company of the Teatro Patio de Comedias Cultural Corporation.

She acted in plays such as The Maids, The Vagina Monologues, Trama, dama y chocolate, Las Marujas entre tereques, Machos (directed by ), Maldita sea, No quiero ser bella, El miedo imaginario de Amparito A Dios, La Tránsito Smith ha sido secuestrada, La mierda, El eterno femenino, and Esperando al Coyot. She was also a cast member of the filmed plays The House of Bernarda Alba and La última escapada. She acted in several sketches on the YouTube series Enchufe.tv.

In 2013, Ormaza was diagnosed with cancer, which she would struggle with for several years. Together with her friends, she organized the "Qumiofarras", a gala of solidarity for people with cancer, with proceeds going toward their treatment. 2015's edition was carried out by friends on her behalf, as she could not attend due to health complications. She died due to illness in Quito on October 22, 2018.

The last work she directed that premiered before her death was Tres historias del mar, which opened on October 20, 2018, at the Malayerba Theater. She also wrote and directed the cantata La Serenísima Madre de las Flores, which premiered on October 24 and 25, 2018, in the chapel of the Museo de la Ciudad.

Her friend Juana Guarderas organized a tribute titled Martha Ormaza: Una vida de teatro, which ran from January 9 to February 17, 2019, at the Patio de Comedias, where she had begun her acting career. It presented three works written and directed by Ormaza – A la luz de los hechos on January 9, Tres historias del mar from January 10 to 13, and La Serenísima Madre de las Flores from January 17 to February 17.

Recognition
Ormaza received the Benjamin Carrión Award from the Casa de la Cultura Ecuatoriana for her work in the theater. She was nominated for the Premio Eugenio Espejo, and in 2017 she won the Francisco Tobar García Award.

References

External links
 

1959 births
2018 deaths
Central University of Ecuador alumni
Ecuadorian dramatists and playwrights
Ecuadorian film actresses
Ecuadorian stage actresses
Ecuadorian television actresses
People from Quito